Soundwave was an annual music festival held in major cities around Australia, run and promoted by Soundwave Touring. The festival originated in Perth, Western Australia, and began travelling to the other Australian capital cities in 2007. It featured a number of international and Australian music acts from various genres, including rock, metal and punk. The festival has been headlined by Deftones, the Offspring, Incubus, Alice in Chains, Bloodhound Gang, Nine Inch Nails, Faith No More, Jimmy Eat World, Jane's Addiction, Soundgarden, Iron Maiden, Queens of the Stone Age, the Smashing Pumpkins, System of a Down, Slipknot, Green Day, Avenged Sevenfold, Linkin Park, Blink-182 and Metallica.

Soundwave Festival occurred annually until 2015. A 2016 iteration of the festival was planned, but its cancellation was announced on 17 December 2015 by founder AJ Maddah due to poor ticket sales.

History

The Soundwave festival originated in Perth, as a smaller festival known as Gravity Soundwave within the Gravity Games. The Gravity Games were held in South Perth along the Swan River, being based mainly on water-based and action sports. The event was sponsored by Vodafone in its first year, with the company reportedly committing one million dollars to the event. Gravity Soundwave provided the music side of the festival, which took place at McCallum Park alongside the Swan River.

Gravity Soundwave was first introduced in the festival's first year, which was held on 14 and 15 October 2004. American pop punk band Good Charlotte effectively became the first headline act of Soundwave, when they performed in the festival's first night along with Gyroscope and One Dollar Short. The following night featured Unwritten Law, Regurgitator, MxPx, Lagwagon and Last Year's Hero.

The 2005 festival was again presented by Vodafone, being held on the night of 8 October. Gravity Soundwave was headlined by Grinspoon, with it also featuring American acts Unwritten Law, Reel Big Fish, and Goldfinger.

The third and final year of the Gravity Games festival in Perth was moved to December 2006, instead of October. Gravity Soundwave featured American act Aiden, local Australian bands Gyroscope, Kisschasy, Parkway Drive, The Getaway Plan and New Zealanders Goodnight Nurse.

2007

In 2007 the festival expanded to include Sydney and Brisbane, and increased the number of bands performing. A number of the artists featured in the 2007 Festival had previously played at the Soundwave Festival in Perth, including Unwritten Law, MxPx and Parkway Drive.

Locations
 Riverstage, Brisbane, 24 February 2007
 Sydney Park, Sydney, 25 February 2007
 Robinson Pavilion, Perth, 3 March 2007

Lineup

Local acts
Brisbane
 Doctor Octopus
 The Disables
 Say Nothing
Sydney
 Angelas Dish
 Regular John
 Fifty Sixx
Perth
 Stars Don't Fall
 Calerway
 Avalore

Notes

*A  Parkway Drive did not appear in Perth
*B  As Tall as Lions replaced The Format

2008

The 2008 Soundwave festival was headlined by The Offspring, along with Incubus and Killswitch Engage and was expanded to include dates in Melbourne and Adelaide, increasing the number of dates from three to five. The expanded Festival featured five stages compared to three the previous year.

Locations
 Riverstage and Parklands, Brisbane, 23 February 2008
 Sydney Park, Sydney, 24 February 2008
 Melbourne Showgrounds, Melbourne, 29 February 2008
 Bonython Park, Adelaide, 1 March 2008
 Steel Blue Oval, Perth, 3 March 2008

Lineup

Local acts
Brisbane
 The Amity Affliction
 Take 21
 The Gift Horse
Sydney
 Trial Kennedy
Melbourne
 Capeside
 Donnie Dureau (Blueline Medic)
Adelaide
 In Fiction
 City Riots
Perth
 Break Even
 Eleventh He Reaches London
 An Evening at Elmwood
 Anime Fire

Notes

*A  Alexisonfire replaced Coheed and Cambria, who withdrew from the lineup to support Linkin Park on their US tour
*B  Thursday replaced Chiodos, who also withdrew from the lineup to support Linkin Park on their US tour
*C  Infectious Grooves replaced Social Distortion, who withdrew from the lineup for unspecified reasons 
*D  From Autumn to Ashes and Still Remains did not appear in Brisbane or Sydney
*E  City and Colour replaced Ace Enders, who withdrew from the lineup for unspecified reasons

2009

The lineup for the 2009 festival was announced on 24 September 2008, the headliners were Nine Inch Nails and sub-headliners were Alice in Chains and Bloodhound Gang.

Presenters of British reality stunt TV show Dirty Sanchez and Finnish stuntmen The Dudesons were masters of ceremonies at Soundwave 2009.

This festival featured 55 acts across six stages.

Locations
 RNA Showgrounds, Brisbane, 21 February 2009
 Eastern Creek Raceway, Sydney, 22 February 2009
 Melbourne Showgrounds, Melbourne, 27 February 2009
 Bonython Park, Adelaide, 28 February 2009
 Steel Blue Oval, Perth, 2 March 2009

Lineup

Local acts
Brisbane
Forlorn Gaze
The Amity Affliction
Sydney
Mission in Motion
Mary Jane Kelly
Melbourne
Stealing O'Neal
House Vs. Hurricane
Adelaide
Double Dragon
Isle of Capri
Perth
Elora Danan

Notes

*A The Dillinger Escape Plan replaced Scars on Broadway
*B Less Than Jake did not appear in Brisbane due to flight delays.
*C Acts were made public in a third announcement and only appeared in Sydney.

2010

The first lineup announcement for the 2010 festival was made on 13 August 2009, the headliners were Faith No More, Jane's Addiction and Placebo, the lineup also featured Paramore, AFI, Jimmy Eat World (who replaced My Chemical Romance) and HIM.

This festival featured 46 acts across six stages.

Locations
 RNA Showgrounds, Brisbane, 20 February 2010
 Eastern Creek Raceway, Sydney, 21 February 2010
 Melbourne Showgrounds, Melbourne, 26 February 2010
 Bonython Park, Adelaide, 27 February 2010
 Steel Blue Oval, Perth, 1 March 2010

Lineup

Local acts
Brisbane
 Too Late Escape
 Adelle
Sydney
 Heroes for Hire
Melbourne
 Death Audio
Adelaide
 ISAW
Perth
 Vanity

Notes

*A Architects replaced The Devil Wears Prada, who withdrew from the lineup so they could support Killswitch Engage on their US tour
*B This Is Hell replaced Maximum the Hormone, who withdrew from the lineup due to drummer Nao being hospitalized
*C Jimmy Eat World replaced My Chemical Romance, who withdrew from the lineup due to lead singer Gerard Way suffering from severe vocal problems
*D Closure in Moscow were removed from the line up with no explanation or replacement act.

2011

The first lineup announcement for the 2011 festival was made on 5 August 2010, the headliners were Iron Maiden and Queens of the Stone Age. The lineup also included The Starting Line, who reunited for the festival.

This festival featured 71 acts across eight stages.

Locations
 RNA Showgrounds, Brisbane, 26 February 2011
 Olympic Park, Sydney, 27 February 2011
 Melbourne Showgrounds, Melbourne, 4 March 2011
 Bonython Park, Adelaide, 5 March 2011
 Claremont Showground, Perth, 7 March 2011

Lineup
Lineup

Iron Maiden (UK)
Queens of the Stone Age (USA)
Slayer (USA) 
Rob Zombie (USA)
Primus (USA)
Slash (USA)
Thirty Seconds to Mars (USA)
Bullet for My Valentine (UK)
One Day as a Lion (USA)
Stone Sour (USA)
Avenged Sevenfold (USA) 
Sum 41 (CAN) 
Third Eye Blind (USA)
Murderdolls (USA)
Social Distortion (USA)
Millencolin (SWE)
Gang of Four (UK)
New Found Glory (USA)
Pennywise (USA)
Bring Me the Horizon (UK)
Anberlin (USA)
Dimmu Borgir (NOR)
The Gaslight Anthem (USA)
Coheed and Cambria (USA)
DevilDriver (USA)
Monster Magnet (USA)
Sevendust (USA)
Less Than Jake (USA)
The Bronx (USA)
The Amity Affliction
Silverstein (CAN)
Terror (USA)
MxPx (USA)
Protest the Hero (CAN)
Melvins (USA)
36 Crazyfists (USA)
Ill Niño (USA)
The Ataris (USA)
Fucked Up (CAN)
Bayside (USA)
Feeder (UK)
The Starting Line (USA)
H2O (USA)
Mad Caddies (USA)
The Maine (USA)
Saxon (UK)  
Trash Talk (USA)
Mayday Parade (USA)
Foxy Shazam (USA)
The Rocket Summer (USA)
Never Shout Never (USA)
The Blackout (UK)
Polar Bear Club (USA) 
Asking Alexandria (UK)
All That Remains (USA)
High on Fire (USA)
Dommin (USA)
The Sword (USA)
Kylesa (USA)
We the Kings (USA)
Blessthefall (USA) 
There for Tomorrow (USA)
Breathe Carolina (USA)
Taking Dawn (USA)
I See Stars (USA)
Rise to Remain (UK)
Nonpoint (USA)
Veara (USA)
Every Avenue (USA)
This Town Needs Guns (UK) 
International Superheroes of Hardcore (USA)

Local acts
Brisbane
 Tria Mera
 Friends with the Enemy
Sydney
 Blatherskite
Melbourne
 Anchors
Adelaide
 Paper Arms
Perth
 Sensory Amusia
 Lacrymae
 Chainsaw Hookers

Notes

*A Slayer pulled out of the Sydney show at the last minute due to Tom Araya being admitted to hospital
*B Avenged Sevenfold withdrew due to a disagreement with promoters over their allocated timeslot
*C Sum 41 only performed in Brisbane and Sydney due to Deryck Whibley's hospitalisation with severe pneumonia. Replaced by International Superheroes of Hardcore
*D Saxon withdrew due to album commitments and family illness
*E Polar Bear Club replaced Alesana, who withdrew from the lineup for unknown reasons
*F Blessthefall replaced A Skylit Drive, who withdrew from the lineup for unknown reasons
*G This Town Needs Guns were added as a bonus band after the two dropouts
*H International Superheroes of Hardcore did not appear in Perth

2012

The lineup for the 2012 festival was first announced on 7 October 2011. The 2012 Soundwave lineup featured System of a Down, Slipknot, Limp Bizkit and Marilyn Manson.

This was the first time Limp Bizkit had toured Australia in eleven years. Their previous tour was the 2001 Big Day Out festival, which was marred by the death of 16-year-old Jessica Michalik during their performance at the Sydney show. Limp Bizkit singer Fred Durst paid tribute to Michalik at each Soundwave date and openly criticised Big Day Out organisers.

The festival also featured a reunited Coal Chamber, who played their first shows since 2003, and also marked the final shows of emo group Thursday.

This festival featured 95 acts across eleven stages.

Locations
 RNA Showgrounds, Brisbane, 25 February 2012, 
 Olympic Park, Sydney, 26 February 2012
 Melbourne Showgrounds, Melbourne, 2 March 2012, 
 Bonython Park, Adelaide, 3 March 2012, 
 Claremont Showground, Perth, 5 March 2012,

Lineup

Local acts
Brisbane
 Milestones
Sydney
 The Sweet Apes
Melbourne
 Aitches
Adelaide
 Admella
Perth
 Sensory Amusia

Notes

*A Bush replaced Hole, who withdrew from the lineup due to a dispute with Soundwave promoters
*B Paradise Lost and Switchfoot replaced DragonForce, who withdrew from the lineup due to recording delays
*C These Kids Wear Crowns did not play in Brisbane due to being double-booked for a sold-out arena show with Simple Plan in Canada
*D Mission in Motion did not appear in Melbourne
*E Black Tide withdrew from the lineup due to a family emergency
*F Switchfoot withdrew from the Adelaide and Perth shows due to a family emergency

2013

The lineup for the 2013 Soundwave Festival was first announced on 8 August 2012, featuring headliners Metallica, Linkin Park and Blink-182, along with sub headliners A Perfect Circle, The Offspring, Garbage, Paramore, Tomahawk, Cypress Hill and Killswitch Engage

This edition of Soundwave was noted for its "drummers' curse", where several bands lost members in the week leading up to the festival:

 Blink-182 drummer Travis Barker was to attempt the long-haul flight and participate in Blink-182's first Australian tour since 2004, saying "[I'm] getting knocked out and getting on a plane to Australia". Barker survived a plane crash in 2008 and suffers from aerophobia. However, after months of counselling and medication, Barker could not overcome his fear of flying and was replaced on the tour by Brooks Wackerman from Bad Religion. 
 Anthrax drummer Charlie Benante was replaced by Jon Dette from Animetal USA due to personal issues 
 Slayer drummer Dave Lombardo announced on Facebook that he was fired due to a dispute over money, he was also replaced by Jon Dette, who was already filling in for Anthrax and has previously played in Slayer
 The Vandals drummer Josh Freese (formerly of A Perfect Circle and Paramore, both were also on the lineup) was replaced by Alkaline Trio drummer Derek Grant due to other commitments.  
 Six Feet Under withdrew from the lineup due to drummer Kevin Talley being injured in a dirtbike accident
 In addition, Shai Hulud vocalist Justin Kraus was hospitalised with chest pain immediately after playing a show in Trenton, New Jersey, he was replaced by Mike Moynihan, who was previously their vocalist between 2009 and 2011 
 Gallows guitarist Stephen Carter left the band in the days leading up to the festival, the band continued as a four-piece.

There was also controversy regarding bands such as Pierce the Veil and The Amity Affliction having their sets cut short in Perth due to complaints from local residents – after this Maddah doubted the festival's future in Western Australia.

This festival featured 72 acts across nine stages (eight stages in Perth).

Locations
 RNA Showgrounds, Brisbane, 23 February 2013
 Olympic Park, Sydney, 24 February 2013, 
 Flemington Racecourse, Melbourne, 1 March 2013, 
 Bonython Park, Adelaide, 2 March 2013, 
 Claremont Showground, Perth, 4 March 2013,

Lineup

Local acts
Brisbane
 The Schoenberg Automaton
Sydney
 Born Lion
Melbourne
 Party Vibez
Adelaide
 Life Pilot

Notes

*A Garbage did not perform in Sydney due to logistical issues
*B Flogging Molly did not appear in Perth
*C Mindless Self Indulgence did not perform in Melbourne due to logistical issues
*D Six Feet Under were forced to withdraw from the lineup after drummer Kevin Talley was injured in an accident
*E Blood On The Dance Floor withdrew from the lineup due to financial issues
*F Dr. Acula broke up in October 2012 and were subsequently removed from the lineup
*G Living With Lions and Mark Tremonti were added to the lineup on 30 October 2012, but Tremonti pulled out the next day due to clashing tour commitments.
*H Puscifer only played in Sydney and Adelaide, they were originally listed as "Special Guests".
*I Malakyte only played in Brisbane, they were originally listed as "Special Guests"
*J The winners of the Triple J Unearthed competition for Perth, In League, were not able to perform due to time constraints alongside Soundwave's conflict with the Claremont Council

2014

The lineup for the 2014 festival was first announced on 23 August 2013. The lineup containing 94 bands, featured Green Day, Avenged Sevenfold, Korn and Alice in Chains

The Perth festival was relocated from Claremont Showground to Arena Joondalup, 25 km north of Perth, two weeks before the beginning of the festival due to Soundwave's ongoing conflict with the Claremont Council. Following a similar situation at the Perth leg of Big Day Out in January of that year, which was also relocated from Claremont Showground to Arena Joondalup, AJ Maddah confirmed that 2014 would be the last Soundwave held in Perth, where the festival originated.

Locations
 RNA Showgrounds, Brisbane, 22 February 2014, 
 Olympic Park, Sydney, 23 February 2014, 
 Flemington Racecourse, Melbourne, 28 February 2014, 
 Bonython Park, Adelaide, 1 March 2014, 
 Arena Joondalup, Perth, 3 March 2014

Lineup

Local acts

Notes

*A The Living End replaced Stone Temple Pilots, who withdrew from the lineup due to scheduling conflicts.
*B Megadeth withdrew from the lineup due to unspecified reasons
*C Newsted withdrew from the lineup due to unspecified reasons.
*D Filter replaced Sevendust, who withdrew from the lineup due to a financial dispute with Soundwave promoters.
*E Desaparecidos withdrew from the lineup due to personal reasons.
*F Dir En Grey did not appear in Perth.
*G Volbeat withdrew from the Adelaide and Perth shows due to a family emergency.
*H Whitechapel withdrew from the lineup due to the death of an immediate family member.
*I Hardcore Superstar withdrew from the lineup due to a scheduling dispute with Soundwave promoters.

2015
On 28 June 2014, Soundwave announced that it will become a two-day festival, held over two consecutive weekends, with half the bands announced playing day one and the other half playing day two, criss-crossing between Adelaide and Melbourne, then Sydney and Brisbane. AJ Maddah stated on Twitter "Putting the line-up across [two] days enables us to minimise clashes; give bands longer sets, better staging, production [and] infrastructure. I am also hoping that this will give fans better value for money and a less stressful day." AJ Maddah later confirmed that 2015 was the last Soundwave for Adelaide in the foreseeable future as it made a $300,000 loss in 2014, but with the $1,400,000 loss in 2015 due to lackluster ticket sales being too large to subsidise out of the other cities.

Locations
 Bonython Park, Adelaide, 21 February 2015 (Day One) & 22 February 2015 (Day Two)
 Melbourne Showgrounds, Melbourne, 21 February 2015 (Day Two) & 22 February 2015 (Day One)
 Olympic Park, Sydney, 28 February (Day One) & 1 March 2015 (Day Two)
 RNA Showgrounds, Brisbane, 28 February (Day Two) & 1 March 2015 (Day One)

Day One Lineup

Day Two Lineup

Local acts
Brisbane
 Columbus
Sydney
 Bare Bones
Melbourne
 I, Valiance
Adelaide
 A Ghost Orchestra

Notes
 
*A Rival Sons withdrew from the lineup due to personal reasons.
*B The Treatment did not appear in Adelaide.
*C Evergreen Terrace withdrew from the lineup due to drummer Brad Moxey suffering serious injuries in an accident.

2016 (cancelled)
On 20 March 2015, AJ Maddah stated that Soundwave 2016 would return to the one-day format and would be held in January instead of the usual late February/early March dates. He also later stated that the 2016 lineup would be announced via "drip-feeding" and would also be smaller in order to achieve longer set times for bands.

Bullet for My Valentine was announced as the first act of Soundwave 2016 via the band's social media accounts and the official Soundwave website on 14 August 2015, and over the next four months, Disturbed was announced as the headliner and 24 other bands were added for a total of 26 bands.

Locations
 RNA Showgrounds, Brisbane, 23 January 2016
 Olympic Park, Sydney, 24 January 2016
 RAS Melbourne Showground, Melbourne, 26 January 2016

Lineup

Notes

*A L7 withdrew from the lineup due to unspecified reasons.

Cancellation
On 15 December 2015, Maddah tweeted that 2016 would be the final ever Soundwave, stating it was due to "stress and haters", and two days later he tweeted that the festival had been officially cancelled.

Various problems contributed to its cancellation, including:
 Poor ticket sales (Maddah once stated that 2016 would "sell out instantly", but around 20,000 tickets in total had been sold at the time of its cancellation)
 L7 withdrawing from the lineup for unspecified reasons
 Bring Me the Horizon claiming that they weren't officially locked in for the festival despite being announced months beforehand
 The festival's venues reportedly not being booked
 Reports surfacing that Maddah owes over $11 million to all the bands who played the 2015 festival

Compilation albums
Official compilation CDs featuring artists who performed at the festival were released through Shock Records.
Soundwave 2008 (2008)
Soundwave 2009 (2009)
Soundwave 2010 (2010)
 Soundwave 2011 (2011)
 Soundwave 2012 (2012)
 Soundwave 2013 (2013)
 Soundwave 2014 (2014)
 Soundwave 2015 (2015)

See also

List of historic rock festivals

References

External links

 

Rock festivals in Australia
Concert tours
Heavy metal festivals in Australia
Summer festivals
Music festivals established in 2004
2004 establishments in Australia
2015 disestablishments in Australia
Recurring events disestablished in 2015
Festivals in Perth, Western Australia